Ralph Arliss (born 11 September 1947) is a British actor.

His television credits include: Doctor Who (in the serial Planet of the Spiders), Z-Cars, The Sweeney, Survivors, Return of the Saint, Secret Army, Love for Lydia, Shoestring, Airline, The Jewel in the Crown, The Day Christ Died, A.D., Dempsey and Makepeace, Call Me Mister, Boon, Prime Suspect, Casualty and The Bill. He played the leading role of Kickalong in the ITV serial Quatermass opposite Sir John Mills in 1979.

His film appearances include roles in The Last Valley (1971), The Asphyx (1972), Deadly Strangers (1975), Blood Relations (1977) and Dead Man's Folly (1986).

He is involved in political training for the Green Party of England and Wales.

Filmography

External links

References

British male television actors
Living people
1947 births